Lubhu (Nepal Bhasa: लुभू) is a place that is part of Mahalaxmi Municipality in Bagmati Province of central Nepal. Lubhu is a sub-urban Newar location situated seven kilometers east of Kathmandu in northern part of Lalitpur, Nepal.

Etymology
There are interesting folklores explaining how Lubhu, which in Newari means “Golden Plate” got its name. It is believed that there was a homosexual resident who worshipped Maha Laksmi and Gobhrateshwar Mahadev to resolve his confused sexual orientation. After three years of devoted worship, the Gods were finally happy and granted the worshipper the body of a “complete man”. Knowing no bounds for his happiness upon this, the devotee is said to have offered both the deities plates made of gold, and hence named the place “Lunbhu”, meaning the same.

In ancient time, Lubhu was hit by disease. Ganga Maharani, the ruler of the city, sold her golden plate and resettles the city. So, the city was called Lubhu which means Golden Plate.

God Bhairav laid under golden umbrella to save the people from disease. The place was then called ‘Subarna Chhatrapur’ but was called ‘Lubhu’, which means the same in Newari.

Culture
The Lubhu people have their own unique Jatras and festivals, the most famous being the Maha Laxmi-Maha Bhairav Jatra observed in the month of Baishakh (April - May). This is the time of the year when the whole of the Newari community of Lubhu gets out of their daily monotonies to celebrate in a truly carefree fashion.

The two chariots  inside the temple of Maha Laksmi are loaded with the gold-plated masks of deities that are house in the same. While one of the chariots is used to carry a set of Maha Laksmi, Ganesh and Kumar statuettes, the other carries another set of Maha Bhairav, Ganesh and Kumari. The chariot is then hoisted by drunken revelers to make a complete tour of all the houses in the locality followed an elaborate Bhoj (feast), which is an essential part of the merrymaking.

Bringing the Maha Laksmi closer to your home is believed to bring you auspices of peace and prosperity. And so is the existence of the Maha Laksmi Temple in the sunny vicinity of simple but very social people.

In fact, there is another temple further up the location of the main Maha Laksmi Temple that houses the mother of Goddess Maha Laksmi. That place is called Devisthan. During the Jatra or procession, the statuette of the same Raths or chariots are taken to her mother’s temple so that the mother-daughter meeting can take place, marking the climax of the carnival.

The temple’s religious architectures date back to the Malla periods, according to stone inscriptions. The head of the Maha Laksmi template is called the Thakali and is also the eldest member of the Guthi (guild, trust).

There are altogether five layers of gold-plated masks of the above mentioned deities enshrined in the template. As soon as the existing one gets even a slight damage, the figurines are covered by yet another layer of the masks made of precious metals and plated by gold. There is also a tall white template of the Gobhrareshwar Mahadev built in the same style as that of the Krishna Mandir of Patan that makes for an interesting piece of structure to study as well as revere.

Demographics 
The settlement in the 730 acres of land of Lubhu is mostly populated by an ethnic Newari community of mainly Shresthas, Maharjans, Rajthala and Gubhaju in the main town area and Brahmin and chhetri in the outskirts.

Economy 
Lubhu is a major textile-production area producing locally made garments. Lubhu is a major source of garments of many Nepalese cloth industries and tourist areas like Thamel. A majority of households have their own small to large scale factories to produce such garments. While some still have the traditional wooden hand looms, many residents own textile factories with electric looms.

Agriculture is also a major occupation.

References

External links
UN map of the municipalities of Lalitpur District

Populated places in Lalitpur District, Nepal